Monsieur Gainsbourg Revisited is a tribute album to the works of late French singer/songwriter Serge Gainsbourg.  First released on Virgin Records in 2006, it consists of English language cover versions of Gainsbourg songs, performed by a diverse array of contemporary artists.  Gainsbourg's former wife, Jane Birkin, sang on one track.

The album charted in France (#8), Switzerland (#23) and Belgium (#6 Wa, #29 Vl).

Track listing

"A Song for Sorry Angel" – Franz Ferdinand & Jane Birkin
"I Love You (Me Either)" ("Je t'aime... moi non plus") – Cat Power & Karen Elson
"I Just Came to Tell You That I'm Going" ("Je suis venu te dire que je m'en vais") – Jarvis Cocker & Kid Loco
"Requiem for Anna" – Portishead
"Requiem for a Jerk" ("Requiem pour un con") – Faultline, Brian Molko & Françoise Hardy
"L'Hôtel" – Michael Stipe
"Au Revoir Emmanuelle" – Tricky
"Lola R. for Ever" – Marianne Faithfull & Sly and Robbie
"Boomerang 2005" – Gonzales, Feist & Dani
"Boy Toy" – Marc Almond and Trash Palace
"The Ballad of Melody Nelson" – Placebo
"Just a Man with a Job" – The Rakes
"I Call It Art" – The Kills
"Those Little Things" – Carla Bruni
American edition bonus tracks
"The Ballad of Bonnie and Clyde" – James Iha & Kazu Makino
"Angels Fall" – Nina Persson & Nathan Larson

References

Sources
 monsieurgainsbourg.com

External links
 Album info from Verve Forecast Records

2006 compilation albums
Virgin Records compilation albums
Electronic compilation albums
Pop compilation albums
Serge Gainsbourg tribute albums